The Ministry of National Education is the Algerian ministry in charge of education in Algeria. Its head office is in El Mouradia, Algiers Province, near Algiers.

See also

 Education in Algeria

References

External links
 Official website in Arabic and French

 

Educational organisations based in Algeria
National Education
Algeria